Chelo's Burden is the second album of the American comics series Love and Rockets by the Hernandez brothers and published in 1986.

The cover of the compilation is by Gilbert Hernandez ("Beto") and the preface by Gary Groth.

Contents 
These stories, dated 1982–1986, are, like in the volume #1 Music for Mechanics, still science-fiction oriented, with monsters and extra-terrestrials. The themes of the (Gilbert's) Central-America village of Palomar and (Jaime's) Los Angeles life are more and more present.

Chronology
Previous album: Music for Mechanics <-> Next album: Las Mujeres Perdidas.

Fantagraphics titles
American graphic novels
1986 graphic novels